Le Gré des champs is an organic raw-cheese from the Montérégie region, in Quebec, Canada. This firm cheese with a nutty flavour contains 35%  fat.

More information
Type: firm paste, tastes of nuts. 
Manufacturer: Fromagerie Au Gré des Champs
Fat content: 35% 
HMoisture content: 44%

See also
 List of cheeses

References

Canadian cheeses
Cow's-milk cheeses